Hell Town is an American drama television series that aired on NBC from September 11 until December 25, 1985. The series features Robert Blake.

Synopsis
Blake stars as Noah "Hardstep" Rivers, a hard-living Catholic priest at a church in a crime-ridden neighborhood on the east side of Los Angeles. Rivers was rather unusual for a priest, as he was a former criminal, played billiards, and didn't have the greatest of speaking skills. Despite all of this, Rivers was the perfect man to lead his church, as he grew up in the neighborhood, so he knew about the gangs and drug dealers who lived there and attacked his parishioners.

Cast
 Robert Blake as Father Noah "Hardstep" Rivers
 Whitman Mayo as One Ball
 Jeff Corey as Lawyer Sam
 Natalie Core as Mother Maggie
 Vonetta McGee as Sister Indigo
 Isabel Grandin as Sister Angel Cakes
 Tony Longo as Stump
 Rhonda Dodson as Sister Daisy
 Zitto Kazann as Crazy Horse

Episodes

Production notes
The series' theme song was performed by Sammy Davis, Jr., who also sang the theme for Blake's previous series, Baretta. The Hell Town pilot film aired on NBC on March 6, 1985.

References

External links
 
Hell Town at CVTA

1980s American drama television series
1985 American television series debuts
1985 American television series endings
Catholicism in fiction
English-language television shows
NBC original programming
Religious drama television series
Television series by Sony Pictures Television
Television shows set in Los Angeles